Mather or Mathers is a Scottish surname, first documented in Kincardineshire, Scotland. and may refer to:

People
 Alonzo C. Mather (1848–1941), president of the Mather Stock Car Company
 Barrie-Jon Mather (born 1973), Great Britain and England international rugby league and rugby union player
 Barry Mather (1909–1982), Canadian journalist
 Bruce Mather (born 1939), Canadian composer
 Cameron Mather (born 1973), Scottish international rugby union player
 Carol Mather (1919–2006), British Army officer and Conservative Member of Parliament
 Cotton Mather (1663–1728), Puritan minister
 David Mather (cricketer) (born 1975), English cricketer
 Elizabeth Mather (1815-1882 ), American writer
 Evan Mather (born 1970), film maker
 Fred Mather (1833–1900), United States pisciculturist
 Frederic Gregory Mather (1844–1925), United States journalist
 Frank Jewett Mather (1868–1953), American art critic
 George R. Mather, American four-star general
 Hiram F. Mather (1796–1868), New York politician
 Increase Mather (1639–1723), Puritan minister 
 James Mather (politician) (1750–1821), Mayor of New Orleans
 Jim Mather (born 1947), Scottish politician
 Joe Mather (born 1982), American baseball player
 John Mather (disambiguation), several people
 Kenneth Mather (1911–1990), British geneticist
 Kevin Mather (1960), Professional Horse Racing Tipster
 Kirtley F. Mather (1888–1978), American geologist
 Margrethe Mather (1886–1939), American photographer and painter
Marshall Mathers (born 1972), American rapper, songwriter, record producer, record executive, film producer, and actor
Melissa Mather, Australian physicist
 Moses Mather (1719–1806), Connecticut clergyman
 Mysterious Dave Mather (born 1851), gunfighter
 Patricia Mather (1925–2012), zoologist
 Percy C. Mather (1884–1933), British missionary to China
 Richard Mather (1596–1669), American Congregational clergyman
 Richard B. Mather (1913–2014), American Sinologist
 Richard Henry Mather (1835–1890), professor of Greek at Amherst College
 Ronald Mather (1927–2011), English rugby league footballer of the 1950s for Lancashire, and Wigan
 Ross Mather (Born Newcastle-Upon-Tyne 1950) Police Officer and police historian
 Samuel Liddell MacGregor Mathers (1854-1918), occultist
 Stephen Mather (1867–1930), American industrialist, conservationist, and first director of the National Park Service
 William G. Mather (1857–1951), head of the Cleveland-Cliffs Iron Company
 William Williams Mather (1804–1859), United States geologist
 Jason Bruce Mather (born 1973), Kenpo 5.0 sensei, dojo owner, and 5th degree black belt

Fictional characters
 Lowell Mather, sitcom character

References

English-language surnames
Occupational surnames
English-language occupational surnames